Holidays in Poland are regulated by the Non-working Days Act of 18 January 1951 (Ustawa z dnia 18 stycznia 1951 o dniach wolnych od pracy; Journal of Laws 1951 No. 4, Item 28). The Act, as amended in 2010, currently defines thirteen public holidays.

Public holidays 

Note: The table below lists only public holidays i.e. holidays which are legally considered to be non-working days.

May Holidays 
Under communist rule, 1 May was celebrated as Labour Day with government-endorsed parades, concerts and similar events. The holiday carried over to present day Poland, albeit with the neutral name of "State Holiday". In addition, 3 May was created as Constitution Day. The May holidays (1, 2 and 3 May) are called "Majówka" in Polish, a pun made from the May month name (it can be translated as May-day picnic).

National and state holidays
The following are national and state holidays in Poland, although they are normally working days unless declared a public holiday:
 19 February - Polish Science Day, established in 2020
 1 March - National "cursed soldiers" Remembrance Day, Narodowy Dzień Pamięci "Żołnierzy Wyklętych", established in 2011
 24 March - National Day for the Remembrance of Poles Rescuing Jews under Nazi German Occupation, established in 2018
 14 April - Baptism of Poland Day, established in 2019
 1 May - State Holiday, informally called Labour Day (Święto Państwowe), public holiday, established in 1950
 3 May  - 3 May Constitution Day (Święto Narodowe Trzeciego Maja), public holiday; first observed in 1919, disestablished in 1946, then reinstated in 1990
 8 May - Victory Day (Narodowy Dzień Zwycięstwa), established in 2015
 12 July- Day of Struggle and Martyrdom of the Polish Villages, established in 2017
 1 August - National Warsaw Uprising Remembrance Day (Narodowy Dzień Pamięci Powstania Warszawskiego) established in 2009
 31 August - Day of Solidarity and Freedom (Dzień Solidarności i Wolności) set on the anniversary of August Agreement from 1980, established in 2005 
 19 October - National Day of Remembrance for Steadfast Clergy, established in 2018
 11 November - National Independence Day (Narodowe Święto Niepodległości), public holiday; first observed in 1937, disestablished in 1945, then reinstated in 1989
 27 December - Poznań uprising Remebrence Day (Narodowy Dzień Pamięci Zwycięskiego Powstania Wielkopolskiego) established in 2021

Former national and state holidays
 9 May - Victory Day (9 May), established in 1945, moved to 8 May in 2015 (public holiday for the last time in 2014)
 22 July - National Day of the Rebirth of Poland (Narodowe Święto Odrodzenia Polski), set on the anniversary of the PKWN Manifesto's signing, established in 1945, disestablished on 28 April 1990 (celebrated for the last time in 1989)
 7 November - Great October Socialist Revolution Day (Wielka Październikowa Rewolucja Socjalistyczna), established in 1945, disestablished in 1990 (The Russian minority and Polish communist loyalists continues to celebrate this holiday)

Other holidays

Holidays declared by statute
The following are holidays declared by statute in Poland. These holidays are declared in statute and as such they form a part of law in Poland. However, these holidays are not granted the distinction of national or state holidays. These are normally working days, unless coinciding with a public holiday.

 27 January– Public Employment Services Worker's Day, Dzień Pracownika Publicznych Służb Zatrudnienia, established in 2010
 8 February – Prison Service Day, Święto Służby Więziennej, established in 2010
 22 February – Crime Victims Day, Dzień Ofiar Przestępstw, coinciding with European Victims Day, established in 2003
 2 May – Flag Day, Dzień Flagi Rzeczypospolitej Polskiej, established in 2004
 2 May – Polish Diaspora Day, Dzień Polonii i Polaków za Granicą, established in 2002
 4 May – Firefighters Day, Dzień Strażaka, coinciding with International Firefighters' Day, established in 2002
 16 May – Border Guard's Day, Święto Straży Granicznej, established in 1991 (this may coincide with Pentecost)
 29 May – Veterans of Overseas Military Activities Day, Dzień Weterana Działań poza Granicami Państwa, coinciding with International Day of United Nations Peacekeepers, established in 2011 (this may coincide with Pentecost or Corpus Christi)
 12 June – State Protection Service's Day, Święto SOP, established in 2018 (this may coincide with Pentecost or Corpus Christi)
 13 June – Military Gendarmerie Day, Święto Żandarmerii Wojskowej, established in 2001 (this may coincide with Pentecost or Corpus Christi)
 24 July – Police Day, Święto Policji, established in 1995
 31 July – Treasury Day, Dzień Skarbowości, celebrated since 2008, established in 2010
 15 August – Armed Forces Day, Święto Wojska Polskiego, this holiday coincides with a public holiday (Assumption of Mary), established in 1992
 29 August – Municipal Police Day, Dzień Straży Gminnej, established in 1997
 1 September – Veterans Day, Dzień Weterana, established in 1997
 21 September – Customs Service Day, Dzień Służby Celnej, established in 1999
 13 October – Paramedics' Day, Dzień Ratownictwa Medycznego, established in 2006
 14 October – Teachers' Day, Dzień Edukacji Narodowej, established in 1972
 16 October – Saint Pope John Paul II Day, Dzień Papieża Jana Pawła II, established in 2005 
 21 November – Social Workers' Day, Dzień Pracownika Socjalnego, established in 1990

Holidays declared by parliamentary resolution
The following are holidays declared by parliamentary resolution in Poland. These holidays are declared by a resolution of Sejm. These holidays do not form a part of law in Poland, and consequently are not granted the distinction of national or state holidays. These are normally working days.

 23 March – Polish-Hungarian Friendship Day, Dzień Przyjaźni Polsko-Węgierskiej, established in 2007 (this may coincide with Easter or Easter Monday)
 24 March – National Life Day, Narodowy Dzień Życia, established in 2004 (this may coincide with Easter or Easter Monday)
 13 April – Katyn Memorial Day, Dzień Pamięci Ofiar Zbrodni Katyńskiej, set on the anniversary of the discovery of mass graves in Katyn, established in 2007 (this may coincide with Easter or Easter Monday)
 18 April – Coma Patients' Day, Dzień Pacjenta w Śpiączce, established in 2012 (this may coincide with Easter or Easter Monday)
 28 April – Day for Safety and Health at Work, Dzień Bezpieczeństwa i Ochrony Zdrowia w Pracy, coincides with Workers' Memorial Day, established in 2003
 27 May – Local Government's Day, Dzień Samorządu Terytorialnego, set on the anniversary of the first local government elections in Poland, established in 2000 (this may coincide with Pentecost or Corpus Christi)
 30 May – Foster Care Day, Dzień Rodzicielstwa Zastępczego, established in 2006 (this may coincide with Pentecost or Corpus Christi)
 1 June – Day Without Alcohol, Dzień bez Alkoholu, established in 2006 (this may coincide with Pentecost or Corpus Christi)
 4 June – Day of Freedom and Citizens' Rights, Dzień Wolności i Praw Obywatelskich, set on the anniversary of 4th of June 1989 Polish elections, established in 2013 (this may coincide with Pentecost or Corpus Christi)
 14 June – National Day of Remembrance of Nazi Concentration Camps Victims, Narodowy Dzień Pamięci Ofiar Nazistowskich Obozów Koncentracyjnych, set on the anniversary of the arrival of the first mass transport of political prisoners to Auschwitz concentration camp, established in 2006 (this may coincide with Corpus Christi)
 28 June – National Day of Remembrance of Poznań 1956 protests, Narodowy Dzień Pamięci Poznańskiego Czerwca 1956, set on the anniversary of the outbreak of Poznań 1956 protests, established in 2006
 11 July - National Day of Remembrance of the victims of the Genocide of the Citizens of the Polish Republic committed by Ukrainian Nationalists, Narodowy Dzień Pamięci Ofiar Ludobójstwa dokonanego przez ukraińskich nacjonalistów na obywatelach II Rzeczypospolitej Polskiej, set on the anniversary of the "bloody sunday" in Volhynia, the culmination of the massacres of Poles in Volhynia, established in 2016
 2 August – Genocide Remembrance Day of the Roma and Sinti, Dzień Pamięci o Zagładzie Romów i Sinti, set on the anniversary of the Roma and Sinti extermination at Auschwitz concentration camp, established in 2011
 17 September – Sybirak's Day, Dzień Sybiraka, set on the anniversary of Soviet invasion of Poland, established in 1998
 27 September – Polish Underground State's Day, Dzień Podziemnego Państwa Polskiego, set on the anniversary of the formation of Service for Poland's Victory, established in 2013
 4 October – Animals' Day, Dzień Zwierząt, coincides with World Animal Day, established in 2006
 13 December – Martial Law Victims Remembrance Day, Dzień Pamięci Ofiar Stanu Wojennego, set on the anniversary of declaration of Martial law in Poland, established in 2002

Other observances
 Grandmother's Day on 21 January 
 Grandfather's Day on 22 January,
 Traders' Day on 2 February
 Valentine's Day on 14 February
 Cat's Day on 17 February
 Tłusty Czwartek on the last Thursday before Lent
 Ostatki on the last day of Carnival,
 Ash Wednesday on the first day of Lent,
 Women's Day on 8 March
 Day of Polish Statistics on 9 March,
 Men's Day on 10 March 
 World Consumer Rights Day on 15 March
 Earth Day on March equinox day
 Truant's Day on 21 March
 ABW Day on 6 April , Polish counter-intelligence agency's (ABW) holiday, celebrated since 2004
 Maundy Thursday on the Thursday immediately preceding Easter Sunday
 Good Friday on the Friday immediately preceding Easter Sunday
 Holy Saturday on the Saturday immediately preceding Easter Sunday - Święconka is performed on this day
 Śmigus Dyngus on Easter Monday (the day following Easter Sunday) is when traditionally the young (and young of heart) have water fights, in continuation of a pagan spring fertility ritual observed in many other cultures
 Warsaw Ghetto Uprising remembered on 19 April
 International Mother Earth Day on 22 April
 Majówka is a spring festival celebrated throughout Europe
 Europe Day on 9 May
 Mother's Day on 26 May,
 World No Tobacco Day on 31 May,
 Children's Day on 1 June
 Father's Day on 23 June
 Kupala Night (Noc Kupały) on the night from 21 to 22 June
 Saint John's Eve "Noc Świętojańska" on the night from 23 to 24 June
 Dog's Day on 1 July
 Power Engineer's Day on  14 Augus
 Dożynki in late August or early September
 Anniversary of the outbreak of the Second World War in Poland on 1 September
 Anniversary of the Soviet invasion of Poland on 17 September
 Car-Free Day on 22 September
 Boy's Day (Dzień Chłopaka) on 30 September - on this day girls give presents to boys
 Polish Post Day (Postman's Day) on 18 October
 Mongrel's Day on 25 October
 Halloween on 31 October
 Wszystkich Swietych on 1 November
 Civil Service Day on November 11, customary Polish holiday, celebrated since 2000, in conjunction with National Independence Day celebrations
 Andrzejki on the night from 29 to 30 November - on this day people (mainly children and teens) are making prophecy by pouring candle wax by key hole to water and guessing what the wax shape means
 Miners' Day on 4 December - Barbórka
 Mikołajki on 6 December - on this day Santa Claus gives sweets to children
 Christmas Eve (Wigilia Bożego Narodzenia) on 24 December
 Sylwester on 31 December

See also
 Flag of Poland#Flag flying days

References

 
Poland
Holidays

pl:Dni wolne od pracy w Polsce